The Sultanate of the Geledi also known as the Gobroon Dynasty  was a Somali kingdom that ruled parts of the Horn of Africa during the late-17th century and 19th century. The Sultanate was governed by the Gobroon dynasty. It was established by the Geledi soldier Ibrahim Adeer, who had defeated various vassals of the Ajuran Sultanate and elevated the Gobroon to wield significant political power. Following Mahamud Ibrahim's consolidation, the dynasty reached its apex under Yusuf Mahamud Ibrahim, who successfully modernized the Geledi economy and eliminated regional threats with the Conquest of Bardera in 1843, and would go on to receive tribute from Said bin Sultan the ruler of the Omani Empire. Geledi Sultans had strong regional ties and built alliances with the Pate and Witu Sultanates on the Swahili coast. Trade and Geledi power would continue to remain strong until the death of the well known Sultan Ahmed Yusuf in 1878. The sultanate was eventually incorporated into Italian Somaliland in 1911.

Origins

At the end of the 17th century, the Ajuran Sultanate was on its decline and various vassals were breaking free or being absorbed by new Somali powers. One of these powers was the Silcis Sultanate, which began consolidating its rule over the Afgooye region. Ibrahim Adeer led the revolt against the Silcis ruler Umar Abrone and his oppressive daughter, Princess Fay. After his victory over the Silcis, Ibrahim then proclaimed himself Sultan and subsequently founded the Gobroon Dynasty.

The Geledi Sultanate was a Rahanweyn Kingdom ruled by the noble Geledi which held sway over the Jubba and Shabelle rivers in the interior and the Benadir coast. The Geledi Sultanate had enough power to force southern Arabians to pay tribute.

The nobles within the Geledi claim descent from Abadir Umar ar-Rida. He had three other brothers, Fakhr and with two others of whom their names are given differently as  Shams, Umudi, Alahi and Ahmed. Together they were known as Afarta Timid, 'the four who came', indicating their origins from Arabia. Claims of descent from Arabia was mainly for legitimacy reasons.

Bureaucracy

The Sultanate of Geledi exerted a strong centralized authority during its existence and possessed all of the institutions and trappings of an integrated modern state: a functioning bureaucracy, a hereditary nobility, titled aristocrats, a taxing system, conducting foreign policy, a state flag as well as a standing army. The great sultanate also maintained written records of their activities which still exist in museums.

The Geledi Sultanate's capital city was at Afgooye where the rulers resided. The kingdom had a number of castles forts with a variety of different architectures in various areas within its realm, including a fortress at Luuq and a citadel at Bardera.

At its height, the Sultanate covered all Rahanweyn territories within present-day Somalia. This is what some refer to as the Geledi confederacy. The confederacy was not only confined to Digil and Mirifle but incorporated other Somalis such as Bimaal, Sheekhaal, and Wacdaan. To reign such a diverse Sultanate, the rulers promoted a policy of indirect and flexible administration. They allowed the tribal chiefs, Imams, Sheikhs (religious figures), and Akhiyaars (notable elders) of the community to play significant roles in the administration of the Sultanate. The Geledi rulers were not only the political head of the Sultanate but also considered religious leaders.  Akhiyaars were elders who would reconcile and solve cases such as murders and recite Al-Fatiha after adjudication. Between two different lineages groups if an injustice was committed then a googol meeting was held between the Akhiyaar of both. 
 
The Sultan would have a regular guard consisting of armed slaves to protect him from those who wished harm. The Ul Hay would be his intermediaries between the Geledi sub lineages and received his directions and intentions on matters. The symbol of the Sultan's authority was his turban. It would be placed on his head by leading elders of the Abiikarow lineage.

Clear devolution of power was also present within the politics of the Geledi Sultan delegating certain regions of the sultanate to be managed by close relatives, who wielded significant influence in their own right. Sultan Ahmed Yusuf's administration was described as such by the British Parliament.

The Somali tribe of Ruhwaina. The Chief of this and other tribes behind Brava, Marka and Mogdisho is Ahmed Yusuf, who resides at Galhed, one day's march or less from the latter town. Two days further inland is Dafert, a large town governed by Aweka Haji, his brother. These are the principal towns of the Ruhwaina. At four, five, and six hours respectively from Marka lie the towns of Golveen (Golweyn), Bulo Mareerta, and Addormo, governed by Abobokur Yusuf, another brother who though nominally under the orders of the first-named chief, levies black-mail on his own account, and negotiates with the governors of Marka and Brava direct. He resides with about 2,000 soldiers principally slaves at Bulo Mareta; the towns of Gulveen which he often visits and Addormo being occupied by somalis growing produce, cattle &c. and doing a large trade with Marka. The brother of Sultan Ahmed Yusuf, Abobokur Yusuf managed the lands opposite the Banadir ports of Brava & Marka and also received a tribute from Brava. This Abobokur Yusuf was accustomed to send messengers to Brava for tribute, and he drew thence about 2,000 dollars per annum.

During the Scramble for Africa period between the 1880s and the first World War, Geledi was bounded to the north  by the Huwan Region, the Huwan later forming a semi-independent vassal state of Abyssinia, to the east by Hobyo Sultanate and Italian leasing of Benadir, and to the south by the British East Africa Protectorate.

Economy

The Geledi Sultanate maintained a vast trading network, and had trade relations with Arabia, Persia, India, Near East, Europe and the Swahili coast, dominating the East African trade, and minting its own currency, and were recognized as a powerful regional power.

In the case of the Geledi, wealth accrued to the nobles and to the Sultanate, not only from the market cultivation which it had utilized from the Shebelle and Jubba valleys, but also trade from their involvement in the slave trade and other enterprises such as ivory, cotton, iron, gold, and among many other commodities. Generally, they also raised livestock animals such as cattle, sheep, goats, and chickens.

By the beginning of the nineteenth century, the Gobroon dynasty had turned their religious prestige into formidable political power and were recognized as the rulers of an increasingly centralized and wealthy state. As already mentioned, much of their wealth was based on control over the fertile riverine lands. Using slave labour obtained through the coastal ports, the Geledi gradually shifted their economic base away from its traditional dependency on pastoralism and subsistence agriculture to one built largely on plantation agriculture and production of cash crops such as grain, cotton, maize, sorghum, and a variety of fruits and vegetables, especially bananas, mangos, sugarcane, cotton, tomatoes, squash and much more. The region is traversed by historic caravan routes. Trade on the rivers themselves connected with the coast to the interior markets. During this period, the Somali agricultural output to Arabian markets was so great that the coast of South Somalia came to be known as the Grain Coast of Yemen and Oman.

Afgooye, the headquarters of the Sultanate, was an extremely wealthy and large city. Afgooye had some thriving industries such as weaving, shoemaking, tableware, jewellery, pottery and produced various products. Afgooye was the crossroads of caravans bringing ostrich feathers, leopard skins, and aloe in exchange for foreign fabrics, sugar, dates and firearms. They raised numerous livestock animals for meat, milk and ghee. The farmers of Afgooye produced large quantity of fruits and vegetables.

Afgooye merchants would boast of their wealth; one of their wealthiest said
Moordiinle iyo mereeyey iyo  mooro lidow, maalki jeri keenow kuma moogi malabside. Bring all the wealth of Moordiinle, Mereeyey, and the enclosures of lidow, I scarcely notice it.

Military

The Geledi army numbered around 20,000 men in times of peace, with a maximum of 50,000 troops in times of war. The supreme commanders of the army were the Sultan and his brother, who in turn had Malaakhs and Garads under them. The military was supplied with rifles and cannons by Somali traders of the coastal regions that controlled the East African arms trade.

The best horse breeds were raised in Luuq and later sent to the army after maturity. They would be used mainly for military purposes, and numerous stone fortifications were erected to provide shelter for the army in the interior and coastal districts. In each province, the soldiers were under the supervision of a military commander known as a Malaakh, and the coastal areas and the Indian Ocean trade were protected by a powerful navy.

Society
The Geledi society is divided into three segments; nobles, commoners, and slaves (to use terms adopted by Helander) Each of these castes consist of several lineage groups whose federation formed the Geledi state; the lineages are divided between two moieties. Tolweyne and Yebdaale, each living in its section of the city. The nobles, in the old society, were the ruling group but depended on the support of the commoner lineages.

Nobility
The noble section of the society belonged to rulers. However, all members of the Geledi clan were also considered to be of noble stock despite the majority of them not being rulers. Nobility was not only exclusive to the Geledi clan as there were rulers of many districts in the Geledi realm that didn't belong to the Geledi lineage.

Commoners
The commoners were typical citizens that mainly consist of non-Geledi Somalis and traditionally consist of urban dwellers, farmers, pastoral nomads as well as officials, merchants, engineers, scholars, soldiers, craftsmen, port workers, and other various professions. The commoners were the majority in the kingdom and were treated as equals.

Slaves
The slaves were mostly of Bantu origin and were used for labour. The men would work as agricultural labourers led by their farmer-owners and some would work in construction led by engineers. They would also be employed into the army and were separated from the rest of the Geledi army and were branched as Mamaluks meaning slave soldiers. The women would work as domestic servants and perform a variety of household services for their owners, from providing, cooking, cleaning, and laundry, taking care of children and elderly dependents, and other household errands. They would also be looked down upon for any kind of sexual contact and were deemed as unattractive.

The Bantus were not exclusive to slavery. Oromos would sometimes be enslaved following raids and wars. However, there were marked differences in terms of the perception, capture, treatment, and duties of the Oromo versus the Bantu slaves. On an individual basis, Oromo subjects were not viewed as racially inferior by their Somali captors. Despite Oromos taking the same roles as the Bantus, they were not treated the same. The most fortunate of the men worked as the officials or bodyguards of the ruler and emirs, or as business managers for rich merchants. They enjoyed significant personal freedom and occasionally held slaves of their own. Prized for their beauty and viewed as legitimate sexual partners, many Oromo women became either wives or concubines of their Somali owners, while others became domestic servants. The most beautiful ones often enjoyed a wealthy lifestyle and became mistresses of the elite or even mothers to rulers.

Rulers
Detailed biographies of the Sultanate's rulers

Legacy
The Sultanate left a rich legacy behind which continues to live on in popular memory and poetry composed about the powerful Sultans and other noble figures during the period. One notable poem was recorded by Virginia Luling in 1989 during her visit to Afgooye. Geledi laashins (poets) sang about the ever present issue of land theft by the Somali government. Sultan Subuge was asked to help the community and was reminded of his legendary Gobroon forefathers of the centuries prior.

The law then was not this law was performed by the leading laashins of Afgooye, Hiraabey, Muuse Cusmaan and Abukar Cali Goitow alongside a few others, addressed to the current leader Sultan Subuge .

Here the richest selection of the poem performed by Goitow

See also
Ajuran Sultanate
Hiraab Imamate
History of Somalia
List of Sunni Muslim dynasties

Notes

References

Further reading

Ajuran Sultanate
Former empires
Former countries in Africa
Somali empires
States and territories disestablished in 1911
Early Modern history of Somalia
Modern history of Somalia
Former countries
Former sultanates